0G, 0-G, or 0/G may refer to:

0G, a size of earplugs (8mm)
0G, or Zero Generation, the mobile telephony for Mobile radio telephone
0-G, or zero gravity, the absence of g-force, also called weightlessness
Zero-g roll, one of the common roller coaster elements
0/G, a model of Ν-Asurada AKF-0
Zero game, a state in game theory where neither player has any legal options
Zero grade, a type of Indo-European ablaut
Zero group, a type of mathematical trivial group
Zero Gravity Corporation

See also

Zero-G (disambiguation)
OG (disambiguation)
G0 (disambiguation)